"Till I Waltz Again with You" is a popular song written by Sid Prosen.

Teresa Brewer rendition
American singer Teresa Brewer recorded "Till I Waltz Again with You" on August 19, 1952.  Rather than a waltz as the title suggests, it is a slow AABA shuffle. Coral Records released it as a single, which first entered the Billboard Best Seller chart on December 6, 1952. It remained on the chart for 22 weeks, including seven weeks at number one. The song also reached number one on the Cash Box chart for six weeks in 1953.

Other recordings

According to some sources, a record by Dick Todd reached No. 17
A recording by Russ Morgan reached No. 23
A version recorded by the Harmonicats reached No. 26 on the charts, as well.  Coral successfully marketed the song to the country audience. 
A version by South Carolinian, Tommy Sosebea reached No. 7 on Billboard's Most Played by Jockeys survey.
 Alma Cogan and the Kordites with orchestra conductor Frank Cordell recorded it in London on February 10, 1952. The song was released by EMI on the His Master's Voice label as catalog number B 10449.
The song was also recorded by Joan Regan in the United Kingdom around the same time. 
In Australia in 1953, it was recorded by Bob Gibson & His Orchestra, featuring vocalist Ross Higgins, on Pacific label catalogue number PB-086, backed with Have You Heard?.
Semprini, pianoforte with Rhythm accompaniment recorded it in London on March 11, 1953, as the third song of the medley "Dancing to the piano (No. 20) - Hit medley of foxtrots" along with "Why Don't You Believe Me" and "Downhearted". The medley was released by EMI on the His Master's Voice label as catalog number B 10457.
On May 25, 1953 Harry James recorded a live version performed at the Astor Roof in New York City. (One Night Stand With Harry James, 1975, Joyce LP-1014)
 A 1953 cover by the singer Izumi Yukimura became a hit in Japan under the title "Omoide no warutsu."
Jane Morgan released a single version in 1965.

Elvis Presley performance
In April 1953, during his senior year in high school, Elvis Presley sang the song in his high school's "Annual Minstrel" show. Presley recalled that the performance did much for his reputation: "I wasn't popular in school... I failed music—only thing I ever failed. And then they entered me in this talent show... when I came onstage I heard people kind of rumbling and whispering and so forth, 'cause nobody knew I even sang. It was amazing how popular I became after that."

See also
List of number-one singles of 1953 (U.S.)

References

1952 songs
Teresa Brewer songs
Number-one singles in the United States